The International System of Quantities (ISQ) consists of the quantities used in physics and in modern science in general, starting with basic quantities such as length and mass, and the relationships between those quantities.  This system underlies the International System of Units (SI) but does not itself determine the units of measurement used for the quantities.  It is inherently incomplete because the number of quantities is potentially infinite.

The system is formally described in a multi-part ISO standard ISO/IEC 80000, first completed in 2009 but subsequently revised and expanded.

Base quantities
The base quantities of a given system of physical quantities is a subset of those quantities, where no base quantity can be expressed in terms of the others, but where every quantity in the system can be expressed in terms of the base quantities.  Within this constraint, the set of base quantities is chosen by convention.  The ISQ defines seven base quantities. The symbols for them, as for other quantities, are written in italics.

The dimension of a physical quantity does not include magnitude or units. The conventional symbolic representation of the dimension of a base quantity is a single upper-case letter in roman (upright) sans-serif type.

Derived quantities

A derived quantity is a quantity in a system of quantities that is defined in terms of only the base quantities of that system. The ISQ defines many derived quantities.

Dimensional expression of derived quantities
The conventional symbolic representation of the dimension of a derived quantity is the product of powers of the dimensions of the base quantities according to the definition of the derived quantity. The symbol may be omitted if its exponent is zero. For example, in the ISQ, the quantity dimension of velocity is denoted . The following table lists some quantities defined by the ISQ.

Such a quantity can be regarded as a derived quantity in the form of the ratio of two quantities of the same dimension.

Logarithmic quantities

Level

The level of a quantity is defined as the logarithm of the ratio of the quantity with a stated reference value of that quantity.  Within the ISQ it is differently defined for a root-power quantity (also known by the deprecated term field quantity) and for a power quantity.  It is not defined for ratios of quantities of other kinds.  Within the ISQ, all levels are treated as derived quantities of dimension 1.  Several units for levels are defined by the SI and classified as "non-SI units accepted for use with the SI units".

An example of level is sound pressure level, with the unit of decibel.

Logarithmic frequency ratio
Units of logarithmic frequency ratio are the octave, corresponding to a factor of 2 in frequency (precisely) and the decade, corresponding to a factor 10.

Information entropy
The ISQ recognizes another logarithmic quantity: information entropy, for which the coherent unit is the natural unit of information (symbol nat).

Documentation
The system is formally described in a multi-part ISO standard ISO/IEC 80000, first completed in 2009 but subsequently revised and expanded, which replaced standards published in 1992, ISO 31 and ISO 1000.  Working jointly, ISO and IEC have formalized parts of the ISQ by giving information and definitions concerning quantities, systems of quantities, units, quantity and unit symbols, and coherent unit systems, with particular reference to the ISQ.  ISO/IEC 80000 defines physical quantities that are measured with the SI units and also includes many other quantities in modern science and technology. The name "International System of Quantities" is used by the General Conference on Weights and Measures (CGPM) to describe the system of quantities that underlie the International System of Units.

See also
Dimensional analysis
List of physical quantities
International System of Units
SI base unit

Notes

References

Further reading
 B. N. Taylor, Ambler Thompson, International System of Units (SI), National Institute of Standards and Technology 2008 edition, .

+
Measurement